Why Me? (何必有我) is a 1985 Hong Kong drama film written, directed by and starring Kent Cheng. The film co-stars Chow Yun-fat and Olivia Cheng. For his performance in the film, Kent Cheng won his first Hong Kong Film Award for Best Actor at the 5th Hong Kong Film Awards.

Cast
 Kent Cheng as Fat Cat
 Olivia Cheng as Koko Cheng
 Chow Yun-fat as Mr. Chow
 Lisa Chiao Chiao as Fat Cat's mother
 Paul Chu as Koko's father
  as Koko's mother
 Ouyang Sha-fei as Koko's grandmother	
 Karen Chan as Ms. Chan
 Eric Tsang as Eric
 Shing Fui-On as Jackson Ken
 Jamie Luk as Ken's rascal
 Fofo Ma as Ken's rascal
 Kara Hui as Woman whose husband gambles
 Lau Kar-wing as Man doing lion dance
 Annette Sam as IQ assessor
 Ng Siu-gong as Policeman at Village Wai
 Peter Lai as Police officer
Wong Yue as Police office
 Yam Choi-bo as Family Service Dept's staff
 Lung Tin-sang as Family Service Dept's staff

Awards and nominations

External links
 
 

1985 films
Hong Kong drama films
1985 drama films
1980s Cantonese-language films
Films about intellectual disability
Films set in Hong Kong
Films shot in Hong Kong
Films directed by Kent Cheng
1980s Hong Kong films